Flavius Lucian Moldovan (born 27 July 1976) is a Romanian former football defender.

Career 
Moldovan has made three appearances for the Romanian national side during his career, which spans back to 1998, when he joined ASA Tîrgu Mureş.

In 1997, he was part of Steaua București team but never played for the first team, his contract being canceled after few weeks only.

Moldovan moved to FC Brașov in 1999, where he spent three years before joining FC Naţional București, eventually making the move to Rapid after the climax of the 2004 season.

Honours

FCM Târgu Mureş
Liga II: 2009–10

References

External links

1976 births
Living people
Romanian footballers
Romania international footballers
Association football central defenders
ASA Târgu Mureș (1962) players
FC Steaua București players
FC Universitatea Cluj players
FC Brașov (1936) players
FC Progresul București players
FC Rapid București players
FC Precizia Săcele players
ACF Gloria Bistrița players
ASA 2013 Târgu Mureș players
Liga I players
Liga II players
People from Reghin